Sporosarcina terrae is a Gram-positive, rod-shaped and non-motile bacterium from the genus of Sporosarcina which has been isolated from orchard soil from Laizhou in China.

References

External links
Type strain of Sporosarcina terrae at BacDive -  the Bacterial Diversity Metadatabase

Bacillales
Bacteria described in 2017